The 2004 Liga Indonesia Premier Division (also known as the Liga Bank Mandiri for sponsorship reasons) was the tenth season of the Liga Indonesia Premier Division, the top Indonesian professional league for association football clubs. The season began on 4 January and ended on 23 December.

Teams

Team changes

Relegated from Premier Division 

 Arema
 Barito Putera
 Perseden
 Petrokimia Putra
 PSDS

Promoted to Premier Division 

 Persebaya
 PSMS
 Persela

Stadiums and locations

League standings

Awards

Top scorers
This is a list of the top scorers from the 2004 season.

Best player
 Ponaryo Astaman (PSM)

References

External links
Indonesia - List of final tables (RSSSF)

Top level Indonesian football league seasons
Indonesian Premier Division seasons
1
1
Indonesia
Indonesia